Sélestat (Alsatian: Schlettstàdt; German: Schlettstadt) is a commune in the Grand Est region of France. An administrative division (sous-préfecture) of the Bas-Rhin department, the town lies on the Ill river,  from the Rhine and the German border. Sélestat is located between the largest communes of Alsace, Strasbourg and Mulhouse.

In 2019, Sélestat had a total population of 19,242, which makes it the eighth most populous town in Alsace. During the Middle Ages and the Renaissance it was the third largest city in the region, after Strasbourg and Colmar, and it is ranked the third commune in Alsace for cultural heritage. Sélestat was founded in the 8th century as a port on the Ill and it experienced a long period of prosperity thanks to the trade in wine and a thriving religious and cultural life. It gradually declined after the Reformation and the French conquest in the 17th century. The town eventually experienced a new demographic growth in the second half of the 20th century when it became a small industrial and cultural centre.

Thanks to its rich heritage, which includes the renowned Humanist Library and an imposing pair of medieval churches, Sélestat is an important tourist destination in Alsace. It also benefits from its location on the Alsace wine road and its proximity to Haut-Kœnigsbourg castle. Aside from the medieval old town, the commune of Sélestat encompasses a nature reserve including one of the largest riparian forests of France.

Name 

The present name of the town is a Frenchification of the original Germanic name. It appeared soon after the French conquest in the 17th century.

Sélestat was first mentioned in 727 as Sclastat. It was mentioned as Scalistati in 775, as Slectistat in 881, as Sclezistat in 884 and as Slezestat in 1095. The current German name, Schlettstadt, appeared in 1310, although various spellings can be noticed on posterior documents, such as Schlestat, Schletstat and Schlettstat. The French administration used various forms from the 17th to the 19th century, such as Frenchified (Sélestat, Sélestadt) and Germanic (Schlestadt, Schelestadt). The town was officially known as Schlettstadt between 1871 and 1919, when Alsace was part of the German Empire. Since 1920, the town's French name is fixed as Sélestat.

The origin of the name "Schlettstadt" is unclear. It probably derives from Germanic words slade or sclade meaning "marshes", and stat for "city". Sélestat would then be a "city in the marshes", a reference to its position in the Grand Ried, a vast area subject to flooding that stretches over the centre of Alsace. Stat could also mean "area" rather than "city".

A popular myth explains that the town takes its name from a dragon called Schletto that founded the settlement after opening up the nearby Lièpvre valley in the Vosges mountains.

History

Birth of the town 

Sélestat was first mentioned in 727 AD but the town probably has an earlier Celtic or Roman origin. Archaeological findings provide evidence of human settlement during the Mesolithic, the Neolithic and the Bronze Age. A large number of wood piles dating from the 1st and 2nd centuries AD were discovered around St. Quirin chapel, suggesting a Roman settlement. At that time Sélestat might have already been a port on the river Ill.

When Sélestat started to appear in written documents in the 8th century, it may have been a market town or simply a village populated by fishermen and farmers. The area was part of the estate of Eberhard, a member of the Alsatian ducal family, who donated it to Murbach Abbey at the end of his life. In 775, Charlemagne spent Christmas in Sélestat, which indicates that the town must have had enough appropriate buildings and population to accommodate his court and troops.

In the 1080s, Sélestat was the property of Hildegard von Eguisheim, mother of Frederick I, Duke of Swabia, the first member of the House of Hohenstaufen. Hildegard transformed the place into a religious centre when she founded St. Faith's Church, which she gave to the Benedictines of Conques Abbey. Monks from Conques opened a priory next to the church in 1092. The House of Hohenstaufen quickly became the leading dynasty of the Holy Roman Empire, which came to the imperial throne in 1152. Being under their protection, the priory of Sélestat strongly influenced local life. Even though Sélestat constituted a distinct parish, its priest had only limited power and the Benedictine prior was the true head of the municipality. At the end of the 12th century, the Hohenstaufen dynasty gradually lost power and as a result the priory started to decline. The citizens used this opportunity to reduce the prior's dominance and secure the power of their parish. They started to build a new parish church in the 1220s. St. George's Church was designed in Gothic style and was significantly larger than St. Faith's Church, another way to signify the end of Benedictine hegemony.

Free imperial city 

Frederick II, ruler of the Holy Roman Empire in the 13th century, realised that his dynasty was losing its power and granted freedoms to many cities in order to keep their allegiance. These cities became Free imperial cities and Sélestat became one of them in 1217. Under the new status Sélestat was able to build city walls and collect taxes on its own. Its serfs and settlers were freed. The German monarch Adolf of Nassau granted Sélestat a constitution in 1292. It was amended many times but it regulated local politics until 1789. Although the new status favoured trade and prosperity, free cities in Alsace were afraid that they would not be defended by imperial forces if a conflict was to occur. So they decided to form an alliance called the Decapolis in 1354, which comprised ten cities: (Haguenau, Colmar, Wissembourg, Turckheim, Obernai, Kaysersberg, Rosheim, Munster, Sélestat and Mulhouse). The seat of the alliance was in Haguenau but its archives were kept in Sélestat. Because the town was the most centrally located, it often hosted meetings of the association.

The Benedictine priory was closed in 1424 after many years of decline. It had long lost its power to the local nobility that were gradually replaced by the bourgeoisie in the mid-14th century. Nevertheless, Sélestat remained a religious centre even after the closing of the priory. Convents were established in the 13th century by Dominicans, Knights Hospitaller and Franciscans. Several abbeys located outside of the town also had a residence in town. At the beginning of the 16th century, Sélestat was a noted centre of Renaissance humanism thanks to its celebrated Latin school. Reformers Beatus Rhenanus and Martin Bucer were among the school's alumni. This school helped spread Protestant ideas among the population, although the local authorities remained faithful to Rome. Erasmus of Rotterdam visited Sélestat four times between 1515 and 1522.

Being a free city, Sélestat attracted settlers from the region who sought protection, freedom and a thriving economic environment. The first city wall, which had become too constricting, was replaced in 1280, and a third wall had to be erected in the 16th century as the city grew. At the end of the Middle Ages, the population was estimated at between 5,000 and 6,000. It was then the fourth largest Alsatian town after Strasbourg (18,000), Colmar and Haguenau (6,000 each). The local economy reached its zenith around 1500. It was centered on shipping and trade (mainly hay, cereals, wine, fish, glass, iron and salt). As the road network was poor and dangerous, goods transited via the Ill river.

Decline 

The decline of the town started in the 1520s, when the humanist school lost its former influence. The troubles surrounding the Protestant Reformation brought instability and unrest to the region. The town experienced the German Peasants' War in 1525 and its convents were sacked by a mob in 1534. During the same period Sélestat lost its pre-eminence in the Decapolis because the city of Mulhouse left the alliance in 1515 and was replaced by Landau in 1521, moving the geographical centre of the alliance to the north.

During the 17th century, Alsace was one of the main battlefields of the Thirty Years War. Sélestat was seized by the Swedes in 1632 after a month-long siege. They surrendered the town to their French allies two years later. The local population long remained predominantly faithful to the House of Habsburg. The Peace of Westphalia (1648) formalised the annexation of the Decapolis by France. Sélestat was briefly occupied by the Germans during the Franco-Dutch War in 1674. The Treaties of Nijmegen (1679) that ended the war also abolished the Decapolis.

At first, Sélestat was a major strategic stronghold for the French. Located near the Rhine, it controlled the access to the Vosges mountains and the rest of France. Vauban, the foremost military architect at that time, rebuilt the town walls between 1675 and 1691. However, after the conquest of Strasbourg in 1681 Sélestat lost much of its strategic importance, as Strasbourg was better located. But it remained a garrison town, and the troops stationed there helped to improve the faltering local economy. Although Protestantism was not forbidden in Alsace, French authorities largely encouraged Catholicism and opened three new convents in Sélestat. Jews were expelled from the town in 1642. During the French Revolution the population was extremely conservative and opposed to change. The new territorial organisation confirmed the decline of the town, which did not become a prefecture and was not distinguished as a subprefecture until 1806, when it replaced Barr in that capacity. Sélestat suffered from the Napoleonic wars as it was besieged and bombed by the Bavarians in 1814 and blockaded by a German coalition in 1815.

Since 1815 

Industry appeared very early in Sélestat. The town had already several factories at the beginning of the 19th century: a tilery, a sawmill, 12 tanneries and 11 mills. Sélestat quickly became specialised in wire gauze making but it never became a large industrial centre, remaining a small town with limited influence. The completion of the Strasbourg-Basel railway (1840), one of the first to be built in France, did not lead to significant urban development. The town walls that still encircled the town were a significant factor in its economic and demographic stagnation. After the Franco-Prussian War of 1870, Alsace and a part of Lorraine were annexed by the new German Empire. The German authorities demolished the city walls in 1874 and built new spacious neighbourhoods around the old town, as they did in Strasbourg and Metz.

Sélestat became French again after the First World War, during which almost a thousand inhabitants died. It was part of the Third Reich during the Second World War. Its liberation took three months and ended in February 1945. The town is a recipient of the War Cross 1914–1918 and War Cross 1939–1945. Sélestat has experienced steady demographic and economic growth since 1945. Its population almost doubled between 1946 and 1999 and two industrial parks were built to accommodate new large factories. The service industry has enriched the town's economy since the 1970s with a large number of small businesses.

It was opened in 1948 and ceased to emit on 1 January 2016.

Governance 

Sélestat is one of the six subprefectures of the Bas-Rhin departement. As such it is at the head of the Sélestat-Erstein arrondissement. Sélestat is also the administrative centre of a canton including 28 other communes which primarily serve as a constituency for local elections. Sélestat is part of the 5th Bas-Rhin constituency for national elections. Since 2002, the Member of the National Assembly for the constituency has been the Republican Antoine Herth.

Sélestat is a member of a federation of communes with shared competencies: the Communauté de communes de Sélestat. Sélestat is its main town, and it includes 11 neighbouring villages. It was created in 1995 to replace an older but similar structure founded in 1969. Sélestat is also the seat of the Central Alsace pays, a structure aiming at developing the area.

The town has had a council since 1292, when it was granted a constitution under the Holy Roman Empire. The constitution shaped the local political system until the French Revolution of 1789. Since then, the town has been administered as all the other communes of France. Its council currently comprises 33 councillors, whose number is defined by law according to the size of the population. The town also has a mayor elected by the councillors.

Alsace in general is a stronghold of the French right. The main French right-wing party, The Republicans, currently holds a large majority in the council (26 councillors). Marcel Bauer, who has been mayor since 2001, is also a member of that party. Voters in Sélestat generally favour right-wing candidates at other elections as well, although Sélestat was governed by the Socialist Party between 1989 and 2001.

Geography 

Sélestat is located at the very centre of Alsace, near the limit separating the Bas-Rhin and Haut-Rhin departments, which traditionally correspond to Lower and Upper Alsace, respectively. Sélestat is also located between Obernai and Colmar. On the other side of the Rhine, Freiburg im Breisgau is around  distant.

Sélestat lies on the Alsace plains, a narrow, very fertile area that stretches between the Rhine and the Vosges mountains. The Ill flows parallel to the Rhine and crosses Sélestat. This river frequently branches and swells, making the area very wet and subject to flooding. Sélestat is only  from the Vosges, at the opening of one of the rare valleys crossing the mountain range and providing a connection to the rest of France. In contrast to the Ill, which has a constant annual flow, the Giessen is a mountain river subject to sudden increases in the water level, especially during the spring thaw period. The Giessen passes north of the town and meets the Ill several kilometers to the east, in Ebersmunster.

The town itself is built on the Giessen alluvial fan so it is slightly higher than the rest of the Alsace plains. Much of its territory is however located on areas liable to flooding. Such areas are mostly located inside the Illwald natural reserve and comprise both forests and meadows.

Transport 

Despite its small size, Sélestat is well connected to transport networks. Alsace as a whole, being part of the economic heart of Europe, has a high road and railway density.

The town is served by the A35 autoroute, a motorway that crosses Alsace north to south, connecting Strasbourg, Colmar and Mulhouse. Further south it connects to the Swiss A3 motorway, and further north to the German B9 highway. Taken together, these three roads connect the Netherlands to Austria. Sélestat is also located at one of the seven crossings of the Vosges mountains, connecting Lorraine to Alsace and Germany.

Sélestat train station was opened in 1840, which makes it one of the oldest in France. It lies on the Strasbourg–Basel railway, which also serves Colmar, Mulhouse and Saint-Louis. Sélestat is at the terminus of two local railways that are partly closed: Sélestat-Lesseux, now ending in Lièpvre, and Sélestat-Saverne, now ending in Molsheim. The former railway runs towards the west through the Vosges, while the latter runs towards the northwest. A third local line, Sélestat-Sundhouse, closed in 1953. Although one of the oldest in France, the Strasbourg-Basel railway allows high speed travel of  because it is very rectilinear and crosses a very flat landscape. Sélestat is served by all regional trains between Strasbourg and Basel (one train in each direction every hour on weekdays). Local trains also run between Sélestat and Molsheim, Sélestat and Strasbourg and Sélestat and Barr. Sélestat is served by a Paris-Colmar TGV every day in each direction, by Strasbourg-Nice and Strasbourg-Cerbère Intercités in the summer, and by EuroCity trains connecting Zurich to Brussels and Basel to Luxembourg City.

SNCF and the Bas-Rhin council operate coach lines between Sélestat and Sainte-Marie-aux-Mines, Saint-Dié-des-Vosges, Ribeauvillé, Marckolsheim, Sundhouse and Villé. The council also arranges for seasonal connections with Haut-Kœnigsbourg castle and Europa Park.

Sélestat and its communauté de communes have their own local bus network, the "Transport intercommunal de Sélestat" (TIS). It comprises two lines, one connecting Châtenois to Ebersheim, and the other Scherwiller to Muttersholtz. These two lines make several stops in Sélestat proper, which is at the centre of the network.

Demography 

, Sélestat had 19,242 inhabitants. It is the 8th most populated commune in Alsace, having reached its maximum population in 2006, with 19,459 inhabitants. The oldest preserved birth registries of the town's Catholic parish go back to the year 1608; the oldest vital records (état civil) go back to the year 1793.

Sélestat was one of the largest towns in the region from the Middle Ages until the beginning of the 19th century. In 1801, it was still the third most populous in Alsace behind Strasbourg and Colmar. It then had 7,375 inhabitants, a slightly higher figure than for Mulhouse (7,197) and Haguenau (7,009). Through the 19th century, Sélestat did not take advantage of industrialisation and rural exodus because its city wall and military function prevented urban growth. It reached its overpopulation threshold around 1830, with around 10,000 inhabitants living on only . Only after the Second World War did Sélestat experience significant demographic growth, almost doubling its population in 50 years. However, this growth was not strong enough for Sélestat to recover its previous rank.

The demographic growth that occurred in Sélestat after 1945 was primarily due to a relatively high birth rate (20.1‰ in Sélestat over the period 1968–1975, compared to 16.9‰ in France). After 1975, this rate progressively declined to match the national figure. Net migration figures remained slightly negative until 1990 because Sélestat and Central Alsace were on the margins of the metropolitan areas of Strasbourg and Colmar and lacked attractivity. Since 1990, the Strasbourg area greatly expanded to gradually reach Sélestat. The town has thus become more attractive to newcomers.

The population of Sélestat is relatively young, 36.2% of the population were under 30 in 2017 (France: 35.7%) and the percentage of people over 60 years old (23.6%) was lower than the national (25.5%) figure. Sélestat has a significant proportion of people between 15 and 44 (39.7%, compared to 36.4% for all of France) because it attracts a large number of young actives and couples starting a family. As other towns in the region, such as Saverne, Haguenau and Molsheim, it welcomes young adults and encourages them to settle in the surrounding villages.

Economy 

At the end of 2015, Sélestat had 2,142 businesses, most of them (1,441) in the tertiary sector. A large share were small businesses; only 9% had more than 10 employees. Sélestat is a retail and services centre for the whole Central Alsace, with a large shopping park and administrative and educational institutions. Industry is nonetheless represented by some large firms, such as the Société alsacienne de meubles, which builds kitchens and bathrooms under a Schmidt and Cuisinella franchise, Amcor (aluminium packaging), Daramic (battery separators), Albany (gauzes for the printing industry), Wanzl (warehouse material), and DHJ (textiles).

Most of the large factories are in an industrial estate located south of the town centre. The newer commercial estate north of the town was developed in the 1970s and is dedicated to retail and cottage industry. The town centre is also an important shopping area with more than 200 businesses.

Sights and culture 
In terms of architecture the city is one of the richest and most varied among the smaller cities of Alsace. Although it is only the 8th most populous town in the region, it has the third largest cultural heritage after Strasbourg and Colmar. Sélestat has 35 listed buildings and 119 additional sites that are indexed in the French list of cultural heritage monuments.

Museums 

The Humanist Library displays one of the oldest and most homogeneous collections of medieval manuscripts and Renaissance books in Europe. Its core is the still almost intact library of Beatus Rhenanus, which was bequeathed to the city and has been maintained by it ever since. The institution also holds the books that belonged to the Latin school of Sélestat, at which Rhenanus and many other reformers were educated around 1500. In 2011, the library has been inscribed in the Unesco's Memory of the World Register.

The library is open to both researchers and tourists, with an exhibition displaying some of its most noteworthy items: an 8th-century lectionary, the first books printed in Alsace, a copy of the Cosmographiae Introductio where the oldest mention of America can be found, and a 1521 document which contains the oldest record of a Christmas tree.

Sélestat also has a museum dedicated to bread and baking and it is the seat of the FRAC d'Alsace, a regional institution whose aim is to collect contemporary works of art (see below, Cultural institutions and events). These works are regularly part of temporary exhibits in Sélestat and other places in Alsace. FRAC possesses works by Aurélie Nemours, Olivier Debré, Mario Merz and Panamarenko, among other artists.

Religious architecture 

Sélestat has two large and remarkable churches from the Middle Ages. St. Faith's Church is the oldest and a prime example of Romanesque architecture. Its design is related to similar buildings both in the Rhine region and in Lorraine. It was built during the second half of the 12th century to replace an earlier building. The church was renovated in the 19th century and a medieval death mask was found during this work. It is often attributed to Hildegard of Eguisheim, founder of the church, and is now displayed in a crypt.

St. George's Church has always served as the main parish church. It is often referred to as "the cathedral" because of its size, but it has never been the seat of a diocese. Its construction started soon after 1200 and was completed at the beginning of the 15th century. Its design is pure Gothic, save for a Romanesque side portal. The choir, the last part to be completed, is the most remarkable element. It is illuminated by 288 stained glass panels, of which 55 date from the 15th century.

Most of the convents of the town have disappeared; the Dominican convent is the only one to have retained much of its original appearance. It was built in the 13th century and still has its church and cloister. The Franciscan convent was completely destroyed, apart from the choir of its church, which now serves as a Protestant church. Sélestat also has an old granary that belonged to the Benedictine priory, and a 16th-century commandery built by the Knights Hospitaller.

The synagogue was built in 1890. Its architecture is typical of the region, with a square shape and discreet neo-romanesque ornaments. Its cupola was destroyed in 1940 by the Nazis and never rebuilt. The Jewish cemetery, located outside the old town, was opened in 1622. It has several 18th century gravestones showing a Christian artistic influence.

Civil and military architecture 

The old town comprises a large number of medieval and Renaissance buildings. The quai des Tanneurs ("tanners' quay") is one of the most picturesque streets in Alsace. A stream used to flow in the middle of the street until the beginning of the 20th century, the relic of a former noxious-smelling trade, since tanning required large amounts of flowing water for treating and washing animal skins. Most of the old tanner houses date back to the Middle Ages and have a tall attic to provide a ventilated space for drying leather. In the neighbouring streets, rue des Oies ("geese street") and rue des Veaux ("calf street"), many houses were covered with a coat of plaster in the 19th century in order to hide the timbering, which was considered too rustic.

Several hôtels particuliers (large townhouses) date from the Renaissance. Most of them have oriel windows that are characteristic of German Renaissance architecture. The grandest of these hôtels belonged to the Ebersmunster abbey and it has a large three-story granary. The Ziegler house has a beautiful oriel that shows the interest of the elite of that time in Antiquity. The oriel partly reflects Vitruvius's architectural legacy and displays the portraits of four key figures of Antiquity. Baroque architecture is visible on some later hôtels dating from the 17th and 18th century. French classical architecture and its main feature, the mansard roof, were largely employed in the 18th century. To reduce costs, buildings were still built with timber framing, but as this technique was considered too Germanic and rustic, they were often covered with a rendering imitating stone.

The German period (1871–1918) left some examples of Wilhelminism in the city's architecture. This prestige-oriented style is a mixture of various earlier styles, including Romanesque, Gothic and neoclassical. Noteworthy are the post office (1884), the courthouse (1900), the lycée Koeberlé (1913) and the water tower (1906). The latter was largely inspired by the water tower in Deventer, Netherlands.

The medieval city walls, built in several stages between the 13th and the 16th century, were torn down after the French annexation in the 17th century. However, four towers escaped destruction. The Tour des Sorcières ("witches' tower"), which served as a gate and a jail, is the tallest. The Tour de l'Horloge ("clock tower") was also originally part of a gate. The clock and the elaborate roof were added in 1614. Two much smaller towers can also be seen, one near the Ill river and another integrated into a later house. All these remains date from the 13th century.

New walls were built by Tarade and Vauban in the 17th century. They were in their turn destroyed in 1874. Only small portions survive: two bastions and the Porte de Strasbourg ("Strasbourg gate"), a good example of French architecture under Louis XIV. Sélestat still has two old arsenals, Sainte-Barbe on the main square (1470) and Saint-Hilaire (1518). The first, with a large crenelated gable, is a fine example of Gothic architecture.

Municipal archive 
The municipal archive (archives municipales) of Sélestat owns and exhibits numerous ancient documents, among which royal charters dating back to the 13th century and, most famously, the register dated from 1521 containing the first written mention of the Christmas tree.

Illwald forest 

The Illwald forest was designated a regional nature reserve in 2013. It lies on the Ill, which forms a complex hydrographic network there. The site is subject to flooding and it is characteristic of the Grand Ried, a flat region located between the Ill and the Rhine that serves as a natural spillway for the two rivers.

Common trees are oaks, willows and alders, which tolerate wet soils. Because the phreatic table is very close to the surface, soils hardly freeze in winter and drought rarely occurs in summer. The nature reserve also has meadows and reed beds. Common animals include a large variety of birds (storks, curlews, harriers), amphibians and mammals (beavers). The reserve is home to the largest fallow deer population in France. This animal was introduced to the area in 1854.

The Illwald contains three chapels that were originally pilgrimage destinations. The Schnellenbuhl chapel was built by Jesuits in 1683; Our Lady of the Oaks dates back to the 15th century but it was rebuilt after a fire in 1920; Our Lady of Peace was built in 1960, and St. Anthony was founded in 1280 but rebuilt in 1930.

Other cultural institutions and events 

Sélestat is the seat of the Agence culturelle d'Alsace ("cultural agency of Alsace", ACA) since 1976. Since 1982, Sélestat is the seat of the FRAC Alsace, the Alsace branch of the Fonds régional d'art contemporain ("Regional Contemporary art fund"), administered by the ACA. A biennale dedicated to contemporary art takes place every two year in autumn since 1984. It has welcomed artists like Daniel Buren, Ben Vautier, Sarkis Zabunyan and Agnès Varda. Since 2006, Sélestat is the seat of Archéologie Alsace (formerly known as the Pôle interdépartemental d'archéologie rhénan, the "Rhenish inter-départemental center for archaeology"), which conducts and documents archaeological field surveys and excavations in Alsace.

Every year since 1927, Sélestat has organised a large flower procession through its old town. The "corso fleuri" is one of the biggest floral shows in eastern France. New floats are made each year around a theme and decorated with dahlias only. A carnaval procession is also held in March. It is the remnant of a very old tradition started by the town's butchers. Sélestat also has festivals dedicated to electronic music (Epidemic Experience), satirical cartoons (Sélest'ival), a spring fun fair, and a summer medieval reenactment with a market and a procession.

The cultural complex Les Tanzmatten, built by Rudy Ricciotti, was inaugurated in 2000. It serves as the town's concert and performances hall, as well as for exhibitions, commercial fairs and weddings.

Sports 
Sélestat Alsace Handball is a noted French handball club. It was founded in 1967. FC Sélestat, the football club, was founded in 1906.

Notable people

Born in Sélestat 

 Martin Bucer, German Protestant reformer
 Fabienne Keller, French politician
 Jacques Paul Klein, French-American Diplomat and General
 Eugène Koeberlé, French surgeon
 Heinrich Kramer, German inquisitor
 Johannes Mentelin, German printer
 Beatus Rhenanus, German humanist
 Charles Sitzenstuhl, French politician
 Joseph Wackenthaler, French organist and composer
 Nicolas-Joseph Wackenthaler, French organist and composer
 Jakob Wimpfeling, German humanist

Connected to Sélestat 
 Ludwig Dringenberg (died in Sélestat)
 Frédéric Fiebig, painter (lived and died in Sélestat)
 Thierry Omeyer (played professionally for Sélestat)
 François Ignace Schaal (died in Sélestat)

Twin towns - sister cities
Sélestat is twinned with:
 Charleroi, Belgium, since 1959
 Waldkirch, Germany, since 1966
 Grenchen, Switzerland, since 1988
 Dornbirn, Austria, since 2006

See also 
 Communes of the Bas-Rhin department
 Humanist Library of Sélestat
 Décapole

References

Citations

A

B

C

D

E

Works cited

External links

 City council website 
 Sélestat tourist office  
 History of the Jewish community of Sélestat 

 
Décapole
Cities in France
Populated places established in the 13th century
Communes of Bas-Rhin
Subprefectures in France
Cities in Grand Est